Sarny Wielkie  is a village in the administrative district of Gmina Niemodlin, within Opole County, Opole Voivodeship, in south-western Poland.

External links 
 Jewish Community in Sarny Wielkie on Virtual Shtetl

References

Sarny Wielkie